Lavrentiy Pavlovich Beria ( – 23 December 1953) was a Georgian Bolshevik and Soviet politician, Marshal of the Soviet Union and state security administrator, chief of the Soviet security, and chief of the People's Commissariat for Internal Affairs (NKVD) under Joseph Stalin during the Second World War, and promoted to deputy premier under Stalin in 1941. He officially joined the Politburo in 1946.

Beria was the longest-lived and most influential of Stalin's secret police chiefs, wielding his most substantial influence during and after the war. Following the Soviet invasion of Poland in 1939, he was responsible for organizing purges such as the Katyn massacre of 22,000 Polish officers and officials. He would later also orchestrate the forced upheaval of minorities from the Caucasus as head of the NKVD, an act that was declared as genocidal by various scholars and, as concerning Chechens, in 2004 by the European Parliament. He simultaneously administered vast sections of the Soviet state, and acted as the de facto Marshal of the Soviet Union in command of NKVD field units responsible for barrier troops and Soviet partisan intelligence and sabotage operations on the Eastern Front.

After the war, Beria organised the communist takeover of the state institutions in central and eastern Europe. His ruthlessness in his duties and skill at producing results culminated in his success in overseeing the Soviet atomic bomb project. Stalin gave it absolute priority, and the project was completed in under five years.

After Stalin's death in March 1953, Beria became First Deputy Chairman of the Council of Ministers and head of the Ministry of Internal Affairs. In this dual capacity, he formed a troika with Georgy Malenkov and Vyacheslav Molotov that briefly led the country in Stalin's place. A coup d'état by Nikita Khrushchev, with help from Marshal of the Soviet Union Georgy Zhukov, removed Beria from power in June 1953. After being arrested, he was tried for treason and other offenses, sentenced to death, and executed on 23 December 1953. During his trial, and after his death, numerous allegations arose that Beria had been a serial rapist and serial killer.

Early life and rise to power 
Lavrentiy Pavlovich Beria was born in Merkheuli, near Sukhumi, in the Sukhum Okrug of the Kutais Governorate (now Gulripshi District, de facto Republic of Abkhazia, or Georgia, then part of the Russian Empire). He grew up in a Georgian Orthodox family; his mother, Marta Jaqeli (1868–1955), was deeply religious and church-going (she spent much time in church and died in a church building). Marta was from the Guria region, descended from a noble Georgian family, and was a widow before marrying Beria's father, Pavle Beria (1872–1922), a landowner in Abkhazia, from the Mingrelian ethnic subgroup. 

In his autobiography, Beria mentions only his sister and his niece, implying that his brother was (or any other siblings were) dead or had no relationship with him after he left Merkheuli. Beria attended a technical school in Sukhumi, and later claimed to have joined the Bolsheviks in March 1917 while a student in the Baku Polytechnicum (subsequently known as the Azerbaijan State Oil Academy). As a student, Beria distinguished himself in mathematics and the sciences.

Beria had earlier worked for the anti-Bolshevik Mussavatists in Baku. After the Red Army captured the city on 28 April 1920, he was saved from execution because there was not enough time to arrange his shooting and replacement; it may also have been that Sergei Kirov intervened. While in prison, Beria formed a connection with Nina Gegechkori (1905–1991), his cellmate's niece, and they eloped on a train. 

In 1919, at the age of 20, Beria started his career in state security when the security service of the Azerbaijan Democratic Republic hired him while he was still a student at the Polytechnicum. In 1920 or 1921 (accounts vary) he joined the Cheka, the original Bolshevik secret police. At that time, a Bolshevik revolt took place in the Menshevik-controlled Democratic Republic of Georgia, and the Red Army subsequently invaded. The Cheka became heavily involved in the conflict, which resulted in the defeat of the Mensheviks and the formation of the Georgian SSR. Beria led the repression of a Georgian nationalist uprising in 1924, after which up to 10,000 people were executed. In 1926, Beria took control of the Georgian OGPU; Sergo Ordzhonikidze, head of the Transcaucasian party, introduced him to fellow-Georgian Joseph Stalin. As a result, Beria became an ally in Stalin's rise to power. During his years at the helm of the Georgian OGPU, Beria effectively destroyed the intelligence networks that Turkey and Iran had developed in the Soviet Caucasus, while successfully penetrating the governments of these countries with his agents.

Beria was appointed First Secretary of the Communist Party of Georgia in 1931, and party leader for the whole Transcaucasian region in 1932. He became a member of the Central Committee of the Communist Party of the Soviet Union in 1934. During this time, he began to attack fellow members of the Georgian Communist Party, particularly Gaioz Devdariani, who served as Minister of Education of the Georgian SSR. Beria ordered the executions of Devdariani's brothers George and Shalva.

By 1935, Beria had become one of Stalin's most trusted subordinates. He cemented his place in Stalin's entourage with a lengthy oration titled, "On the History of the Bolshevik Organisations in Transcaucasia" (later published as a book), which emphasised Stalin's role. When Stalin's purge of the Communist Party and Soviet government began in 1934 after the assassination of Leningrad party boss Sergei Kirov (1 December 1934), Beria ran the purges in Transcaucasia. In June 1937, he said in a speech, "Let our enemies know that anyone who attempts to raise a hand against the will of our people, against the will of the party of Lenin and Stalin, will be mercilessly crushed and destroyed."

Head of the NKVD 

In August 1938, Stalin brought Beria to Moscow as deputy head of the People's Commissariat for Internal Affairs (NKVD), the ministry which oversaw the state security and police forces. Under Nikolai Yezhov, the NKVD carried out the Great Purge: the imprisonment or execution of a huge number, possibly over a million, of citizens throughout the Soviet Union as alleged "enemies of the people". By 1938, however, the oppression had become so extensive that it was damaging the infrastructure, economy and even the armed forces of the Soviet state, prompting Stalin to wind the purge down. In September, Beria was appointed head of the Main Administration of State Security (GUGB) of the NKVD, and in November he succeeded Yezhov as NKVD head. Yezhov was executed in 1940.

Beria's appointment marked an easing of the repression begun under Yezhov. Over 100,000 people were released from the labour camps. The government officially admitted that there had been some injustice and "excesses" during the purges, which were blamed entirely on Yezhov. But the liberalization was only relative: arrests, torture and executions continued. On 16 January 1940, Beria sent Stalin a list of 457 "enemies of the people" of whom 346 were marked to be shot. They included Yezhov and his brother and nephews; Mikhail Frinovsky and his wife and teenage son, Yefim Yevdokimov and his wife and teenage son, and dozens more former NKVD officers, and the renowned writer Isaac Babel and the journalist Mikhail Koltsov. 

Some of the NKVD officers Beria promoted, such as Boris Rodos, Lev Shvartzman, and Bogdan Kobulov were brutal torturers who were executed in the 1950s. The theatre director Vsevolod Meyerhold described being beaten on the spine and soles of his feet until "the pain was so intense that it felt as if boiling water was being poured on these sensitive areas." His interrogation record was signed by Shvartzman. Robert Eikhe, a former high ranking party official, was sadistically beaten and had an eye gouged out by Rodos, in Beria's office, while Beria watched. He not only permitted and encouraged the beating of prisoners, but in some case carried it out in person. One prisoner, S.I.Abramov, who survived to give evidence in the 1950s, testified that he was brought to Beria's office and accused of plotting to blow up the Moscow metro, which he denied.

In March 1939, Beria was appointed as a candidate member of the Communist Party's Politburo. Although he did not rise to full membership until 1946, he was by then one of the senior leaders of the Soviet state. In 1941, he was made a Commissar General of State Security, the highest quasi-military rank within the Soviet police system of that time.

In 1940 the pace of the purges accelerated again. During this period, Beria supervised deportations of people identified as "political enemies" from Poland, Lithuania, Latvia and Estonia after Soviet occupation of those countries.

On 5 March 1940, after the Gestapo–NKVD Third Conference was held in Zakopane, Beria sent a note (no. 794/B) to Stalin in which he stated that the Polish prisoners of war kept at camps and prisons in western Belarus and Ukraine were enemies of the Soviet Union, and recommended their execution. Most of them were military officers, but there were also intelligentsia, doctors, priests, and others in a total of 22,000 people. With Stalin's approval, Beria's NKVD executed them in what became known as the Katyn massacre.

From October 1940 to February 1942, the NKVD under Beria carried out a new purge of the Red Army and related industries. In February 1941, Beria became deputy chairman of the Council of People's Commissars, and in June, following Nazi Germany's invasion of the Soviet Union, he became a member of the State Defense Committee (GKO). During the Second World War, he took on major domestic responsibilities and mobilised the millions of people imprisoned in NKVD Gulag camps into wartime production. He took control of the manufacture of armaments, and (with Georgy Malenkov) aircraft and aircraft engines. This was the beginning of Beria's alliance with Malenkov, which later became of central importance.

In 1944, as the Soviet Union had repelled the German invasion, Beria was placed in charge of the various ethnic minorities accused of anti-sovietism and/or collaboration with the invaders, including the Balkars, Karachays, Chechens, Ingush, Crimean Tatars, Kalmyks, Pontic Greeks, and Volga Germans. All these groups were deported to Soviet Central Asia (see "Population transfer in the Soviet Union").

In December 1944, the NKVD supervised the Soviet atomic bomb project ("Task No. 1"), which built and tested a bomb by 29 August 1949. The project was extremely labour-intensive. At least 330,000 people, including 10,000 technicians, were involved. The Gulag system provided tens of thousands of people for work in uranium mines and for the construction and operation of uranium processing plants. They also constructed test facilities, such as those at Semipalatinsk and in the Novaya Zemlya archipelago.

In July 1945, as Soviet police ranks were converted to a military uniform system, Beria's rank was officially converted to that of Marshal of the Soviet Union. Although he had never held a traditional military command, he made a significant contribution to the victory of the Soviet Union in the war through his organization of wartime production and his use of partisans. 

Abroad, Beria had met with Kim Il-sung, the future leader of North Korea, several times when the Soviet troops had declared war on Japan and occupied the northern half of Korea from August 1945. Beria recommended that Stalin install a communist leader in the occupied territories.

Post-war politics 

With Stalin nearing 70, a concealed struggle for succession amongst his entourage dominated Soviet politics. At the end of the war, Andrei Zhdanov, who had served as the Communist Party leader in Leningrad (now Saint Petersburg) during the war, seemed the most likely candidate. After 1946, Beria formed an alliance with Malenkov to counter Zhdanov's rise.

In January 1946, Beria resigned as chief of the NKVD while retaining general control over national security matters as Deputy Prime Minister and Curator of the Organs of State Security under Stalin. However, the new NKVD chief, Sergei Kruglov, was not a supporter of Beria. Also by the summer of 1946 Beria's man, Vsevolod Nikolayevich Merkulov, was replaced as head of the Ministry for State Security (MGB) by Viktor Abakumov. 

Abakumov had headed SMERSH from 1943 to 1946; his relationship with Beria involved close collaboration (since Abakumov owed his rise to Beria's support and esteem) but also rivalry. Stalin had begun to encourage Abakumov to form his own network inside the MGB to counter Beria's dominance of the power ministries. Kruglov and Abakumov moved expeditiously to replace Beria's men in the security apparatus with new people. Very soon, Deputy Minister Stepan Mamulov of the Ministry of Internal Affairs (MVD) was the only close Beria ally left outside foreign intelligence, on which Beria kept a grip. 

In the following months, Abakumov started carrying out important operations without consulting Beria, often working with Zhdanov, and on Stalin's direct orders. One of the first such moves involved the Jewish Anti-Fascist Committee affair, which commenced in October 1946 and eventually led to the murder of Solomon Mikhoels and the arrest of many other members. After Zhdanov died in August 1948, Beria and Malenkov consolidated their power by means of a purge of Zhdanov's associates in the so-called "Leningrad Affair". Those executed included Zhdanov's deputy, Alexey Kuznetsov; the economic chief, Nikolai Voznesensky; the Party head in Leningrad, Pyotr Popkov; and the Prime Minister of the Russian SFSR, Mikhail Rodionov. 

However, Beria was unable to purge Mikhail Suslov, whom he hated. Beria felt increasingly uncomfortable with Suslov's growing relationship with Stalin. Russian historian Roy Medvedev speculates in his book, Neizvestnyi Stalin, that Stalin had made Suslov his "secret heir". Evidently, Beria felt so threatened by Suslov that after his arrest in 1953, documents were found in his safe labelling Suslov the No. 1 person he wanted to "eliminate".

During the postwar years, Beria supervised the establishment of communist regimes in Eastern Europe and chose their Soviet-backed leaders. Starting in 1948, Abakumov initiated several investigations against these leaders, which culminated with the arrest in November 1952 of Rudolf Slánský, Bedřich Geminder and others in Czechoslovakia. These men were frequently accused of Zionism, "rootless cosmopolitanism", and providing weapons to Israel. Such charges deeply disturbed Beria, as he had directly ordered the sale of large amounts of Czech arms to Israel. Altogether, fourteen Czechoslovak communist leaders, eleven of them Jewish, were tried, convicted and executed as part of Soviet policy to woo Arab nationalists, which culminated in the major Czech-Egypt arms deal of 1955. 

The Doctors' Plot began in 1951, when a number of the country's prominent Jewish physicians were accused of poisoning top Soviet leaders and arrested. Concurrently, the Soviet press began an anti-Semitic propaganda campaign, euphemistically termed the "struggle against rootless cosmopolitanism". Initially, 37 men were arrested, but the number quickly grew into hundreds. Scores of Soviet Jews were dismissed from their jobs, arrested, sent to the Gulag, or executed. The "plot" was presumably invented by Stalin. A few days after Stalin's death on 5 March 1953, Beria freed all the arrested doctors, announced that the entire matter was fabricated, and arrested the MGB functionaries directly involved.

Stalin's death 

Stalin's aide, Vasili Lozgachev, reported that Beria and Malenkov were the first members of the Politburo to see Stalin's condition when he was found unconscious. They arrived at Stalin's dacha at Kuntsevo at 03:00 on 2 March 1953, after being called by Nikita Khrushchev and Nikolai Bulganin. The latter two did not want to risk Stalin's wrath by checking themselves. Lozgachev tried to explain to Beria that the unconscious Stalin (still in his soiled clothing) was "sick and needed medical attention". Beria angrily dismissed his claims as panic-mongering and quickly left, ordering him, "Don't bother us, don't cause a panic and don't disturb Comrade Stalin!" Alexsei Rybin, Stalin's bodyguard, recalled, "No one wanted to telephone Beria, since most of the personal bodyguards hated Beria".

Calling a doctor was deferred for a full twelve hours after Stalin was rendered paralysed, incontinent and unable to speak. This decision is noted as "extraordinary" by the historian Simon Sebag Montefiore, but also consistent with the standard Stalinist policy of deferring all decision-making (no matter how necessary or obvious) without official orders from higher authority. Beria's decision to avoid immediately calling a doctor was tacitly supported (or at least not opposed) by the rest of the Politburo, which was rudderless without Stalin's micromanagement and paralysed by a legitimate fear that he would suddenly recover and take reprisals on anyone who had dared to act without his orders. Stalin's suspicion of doctors in the wake of the Doctors' Plot was well known at the time of his sickness; his private physician was already being tortured in the basement of the Lubyanka for suggesting the leader required more bed rest.

Khrushchev wrote in his memoirs that Beria had, immediately after Stalin's stroke, gone about "spewing hatred against [Stalin] and mocking him". When Stalin showed signs of consciousness, Beria dropped to his knees and kissed his hand. When Stalin fell unconscious again, Beria immediately stood and spat.

After Stalin's death on 5 March 1953, Beria's ambitions sprang into full force. In the uneasy silence following the cessation of Stalin's last agonies, he was the first to dart forward to kiss his lifeless form (a move likened by Montefiore to "wrenching a dead King's ring off his finger"). While the rest of Stalin's inner circle (even Molotov, saved from certain liquidation) stood sobbing unashamedly over the body, Beria reportedly appeared "radiant", "regenerated" and "glistening with ill-concealed relish". When Beria left the room, he broke the sombre atmosphere by shouting loudly for his driver, his voice echoing with what Stalin's daughter Svetlana Alliluyeva called "the ring of triumph unconcealed". Alliluyeva noticed how the Politburo seemed openly frightened of Beria and unnerved by his bold display of ambition. "He's off to take power," Mikoyan recalled muttering to Khrushchev. That prompted a "frantic" dash for their own limousines to intercept him at the Kremlin.

Stalin's death prevented a final purge of Old Bolsheviks Mikoyan and Molotov, for which Stalin had been laying the groundwork in the year prior to his death. Shortly after Stalin's death, Beria announced triumphantly to the Politburo that he had "done [Stalin] in" and "saved [us] all", according to Molotov's memoirs. The assertion that Stalin was poisoned by Beria's associates has been supported by Edvard Radzinsky and other authors.

First Deputy Premier and Soviet triumvirate 
After Stalin's death, Beria was appointed First Deputy Premier and reappointed head of the MVD, which he merged with the MGB. His close ally Malenkov was the new Premier and initially the most powerful man in the post-Stalin leadership. Beria was second-most powerful, and given Malenkov's personal weakness, was poised to become the power behind the throne and ultimately leader himself. Khrushchev became Party Secretary. Kliment Voroshilov became Chairman of the Presidium of the Supreme Soviet (i.e., the nominal head of state).

Beria undertook some measures of liberalisation immediately after Stalin's death. He reorganised the MVD and drastically reduced its economic power and penal responsibilities. A number of costly construction projects, such as the Salekhard–Igarka Railway, were scrapped, and the remaining industrial enterprises became affiliated under other economic ministries. The Gulag system was transferred to the Ministry of Justice, and a mass release of over a million prisoners was announced, although only prisoners convicted for "non-political" crimes were released. That amnesty led to a substantial increase in crime and would later be used against Beria by his rivals.

To consolidate power, Beria also took steps to recognise the rights of non-Russian nationalities. He questioned the traditional policy of Russification and encouraged local officials to assert their own identities. He first turned to Georgia, where Stalin's fabricated Mingrelian affair was called off and the republic's key posts were filled by pro-Beria Georgians. Beria's policies of granting more autonomy to the Ukrainian SSR alarmed Khrushchev, for whom Ukraine was a power base. Khrushchev then tried to draw Malenkov to his side, warning that "Beria is sharpening his knives".

Khrushchev opposed the alliance between Beria and Malenkov, but he was initially unable to challenge them. Khrushchev's opportunity came in June 1953 when a spontaneous uprising against the East German communist regime broke out in East Berlin. Based on Beria's statements, other leaders suspected that in the wake of the uprising, he would consider trading the reunification of Germany and the end of the Cold War for massive aid from the United States, as had been received in the Second World War. 

The cost of the war still weighed heavily on the Soviet economy. Beria craved the vast financial resources that another (more sustained) relationship with the U.S. could provide. According to some later sources, he ostensibly even considered giving the Estonian, Latvian and Lithuanian SSRs "serious prospects of national autonomy", possibly similar to the Soviet satellite states in Europe. Beria said of East Germany, "It is not even a real state but one kept in being only by Soviet troops."

The East German uprising convinced Molotov, Malenkov and Bulganin that Beria's policies were dangerous and destabilising to Soviet power. Within days, Khrushchev persuaded the other leaders to support a coup d'etat against Beria.

Arrest, trial and execution 

Beria, as first deputy chairman of the Council of Ministers and an influential Politburo member, saw himself as Stalin's successor, while wider Politburo members had contrasting thoughts on future leadership. On 26 June 1953, Beria was arrested and held in an undisclosed location near Moscow. Accounts of his downfall vary considerably. The historical consensus is that Khrushchev prepared an elaborate ambush, convening a meeting of the Presidium on 26 June, where he suddenly launched a scathing attack on Beria, accusing him of being a traitor and spy in the pay of British intelligence. Beria was taken completely by surprise. He asked, "What's going on, Nikita Sergeyevich? Why are you picking fleas in my trousers?" 

When Beria finally realized what was happening and plaintively appealed to Malenkov (an old friend) to speak for him, Malenkov silently hung his head and pressed a button on his desk. This was an arranged signal to Marshal Georgy Zhukov and a group of armed officers in a nearby room, who burst in and arrested Beria.

As Beria's men were guarding the Kremlin at the time, he was held there in a special cell until nightfall and then smuggled out in the trunk of a car. He was taken first to the Moscow guardhouse and then to the bunker of the headquarters of Moscow Military District. Defence Minister Bulganin ordered the Kantemirovskaya Tank Division and Tamanskaya Motor Rifle Division to move into Moscow to prevent security forces loyal to Beria from rescuing him. Many of Beria's subordinates, proteges and associates were also arrested, among them Merkulov, Bogdan Kobulov, Sergey Goglidze, Vladimir Dekanozov, Pavel Meshik, and Lev Vlodzimirskiy.

Beria and his men were tried by a "special session" of the Supreme Court of the Soviet Union on 23 December 1953 with no defense counsel and no right of appeal. Marshal Ivan Konev was the chairman of the court.

Beria was found guilty of:
 Treason. It was alleged that he had maintained secret connections with foreign intelligence services. In particular, attempts to initiate peace talks with Adolf Hitler in 1941 through the ambassador of the Kingdom of Bulgaria were classified as treason, though Beria had been acting on the orders of Stalin and Molotov. It was also alleged that Beria, who in 1942 helped organise the defence of the North Caucasus, tried to let the Germans occupy the Caucasus. Beria's suggestion to his assistants that to improve foreign relations it was reasonable to transfer the Kaliningrad Oblast to Germany, part of Karelia to Finland, the Moldavian SSR to Romania and the Kuril Islands to Japan also formed part of the allegations against him.
 Terrorism. Beria's participation in the purge of the Red Army in 1941 was classified as an act of terrorism.
 Counter-revolutionary activity during the Russian Civil War. In 1919, Beria worked in the security service of the Azerbaijan Democratic Republic. Beria maintained that he was assigned to that work by the Hummet party, which subsequently merged with the Adalat Party, the Ahrar Party, and the Baku Bolsheviks to establish the Azerbaijan Communist Party.

Beria and all the other defendants were sentenced to death on the day of the trial. The other six defendants  Dekanozov, Merkulov, Vlodzimirsky, Meshik, Goglidze and Kobulov  were shot immediately after the trial ended. 

Beria was executed separately; he allegedly pleaded on his knees before collapsing to the floor wailing. He was shot through the forehead by General Pavel Batitsky. His final moments bore great similarity to those of his own predecessor, Nikolai Yezhov, who begged for his life before his execution in 1940. Beria's body was cremated and the remains buried in Communal Grave No. 3 at Donskoi Monastery Cemetery in Moscow.

Beria's personal archive (said to have included "compromising" material on his former colleagues) was destroyed on Khrushchev's orders.

Sexual predation
At Beria's trial in 1953, it became known that he had committed numerous rapes during the years he was NKVD chief. Montefiore concludes that the information "reveals a sexual predator who used his power to indulge himself in obsessive depravity". After his death, charges of rape and sexual abuse were disputed by people close to Beria, including his wife Nina and his son Sergo.

According to the testimony of Colonel Rafael Semyonovich Sarkisov and Colonel Sardion Nikolaevich Nadaraiatwo of Beria's bodyguardson warm nights during the war, Beria was often driven around Moscow in his limousine. He would point out young women that he wanted to be taken to his dacha, where wine and a feast awaited them. After dining, Beria would take the women into his soundproofed office and rape them. 

His bodyguards reported that their duties included handing each victim a flower bouquet as she left the house. Accepting it implied that the sex had been consensual; refusal would mean arrest. Sarkisov reported that after one woman rejected Beria's advances and ran out of his office, Sarkisov mistakenly handed her the flowers anyway. The enraged Beria declared, "Now, it is not a bouquet, it is a wreath! May it rot on your grave!" The NKVD arrested the woman the next day.

The testimony of Sarkisov and Nadaraia has been partially corroborated by Edward Ellis Smith, an American who served in the US embassy in Moscow after the war. According to historian Amy Knight, "Smith noted that Beria's escapades were common knowledge among embassy personnel because his house was on the same street as a residence for Americans, and those who lived there saw girls brought to Beria's house late at night in a limousine."

Women also submitted to Beria's sexual advances in exchange for the promise of freedom for imprisoned relatives. In one case, Beria picked up Tatiana Okunevskaya, a well-known Soviet actress, under the pretence of bringing her to perform for the Politburo. Instead he took her to his dacha, where he offered to free her father and grandmother from prison if she submitted. He then raped her, telling her, "Scream or not, it doesn't matter". In fact, Beria knew that Okunevskaya's relatives had been executed months earlier. Okunevskaya was arrested shortly afterwards and sentenced to solitary confinement in the Gulag, which she survived.

Stalin and other high-ranking officials came to distrust Beria. In one instance, when Stalin learned that his then-teenage daughter, Svetlana, was alone with Beria at his house, he telephoned her and told her to leave immediately. When Beria complimented Alexander Poskrebyshev's daughter on her beauty, Poskrebyshev quickly pulled her aside and instructed her, "Don't ever accept a lift from Beria". After taking an interest in Voroshilov's daughter-in-law during a party at their summer dacha, Beria shadowed their car closely all the way back to the Kremlin, terrifying Voroshilov's wife.

Before and during the war, Beria directed Sarkisov to keep a list of the names and phone numbers of the women that he had sex with. Eventually, he ordered Sarkisov to destroy the list as a security risk, but Sarkisov retained a secret copy. When Beria's fall from power began, Sarkisov passed the list to Viktor Abakumov, the former wartime head of SMERSH and now chief of the MGBthe successor to the NKVD. Abakumov was already aggressively building a case against Beria. Stalin, who was also seeking to undermine Beria, was thrilled by the detailed records kept by Sarkisov, demanding: "Send me everything this asshole writes down!" 

In 2003, the Russian government acknowledged Sarkisov's handwritten list of Beria's victims, which reportedly contains hundreds of names. The victims' names were also released to the public in 2003.

Evidence suggests that Beria also murdered some of these women. In 1993, construction workers installing streetlights unearthed human bones near Beria's Moscow villa (now the Tunisian embassy). Skulls, pelvises and leg bones were found. In 1998, the skeletal remains of five young women were discovered during work carried out on the water pipes in the garden of the same villa. In 2011, building workers digging a ditch in Moscow city centre unearthed a common grave near the same residence containing a pile of human bones, including two children's skulls covered with lime or chlorine. The lack of articles and the condition of the remains indicate that these bodies were buried naked. According to Martin Sixsmith, in a BBC documentary, "Beria spent his nights having teenagers abducted from the streets and brought here for him to rape. Those who resisted were strangled and buried in his wife's rose garden." Vladimir Zharov, head of the Department of Forensic Medicine at Moscow's State University of Medicine and Dentistry and then the head of the criminal forensics bureau, said a torture chamber existed in the basement of Beria's villa and that there was probably an underground passage to burial sites.

Additionally, an American report from 1952 quoted a former Muscovite as having "learned from one of Beria's mistresses that it was Beria's habit to order various women to become intimate with him and that he threatened them with prison if they refused." According to the source's account, "on one occasion Beria appeared, dressed in pajamas at the dacha where his friend was living. He was accompanied by his personal bodyguard."

Honours and awards
Beria was deprived of all titles and awards on December 23, 1953.

Soviet Union
 Hero of Socialist Labour (1943)
 Order of Lenin (1935, 1943, 1945, 1949, 1949)
 Order of the Red Banner (1924, 1942, 1944)
 Order of Suvorov, 1st class (1944)
 Medal "For the Victory over Germany in the Great Patriotic War 1941–1945" (1945)
 Medal "For the Defence of Stalingrad" (1942)
 Medal "For the Defence of Moscow" (1944)
 Medal "For the Defence of the Caucasus" (1944)
 Jubilee Medal "30 Years of the Soviet Army and Navy" (1948)
 Medal "In Commemoration of the 800th Anniversary of Moscow" (1947)
 Honorary State Security Officer, twice
 Stalin Prize (1949, 1951)

Soviet Republics
 Order of the Red Banner of Labour (Armenian SSR)
 Order of the Red Banner of Labour (Azerbaijan SSR)
 Order of the Red Banner of Labour (Georgian SSR)
 Order of the Red Banner (Georgian SSR)
 Order of the Republic (Republic of Tuva)

Mongolia
 Order of Sukhbaatar (Mongolia)
 Order of the Red Banner (Mongolia)
 Medal "25 Years of the Mongolian People's Revolution" (Mongolia)

In popular culture

Theatre 
Beria is the central character in Good Night, Uncle Joe by Canadian playwright David Elendune. The play is a fictionalised account of the events leading up to Stalin's death.

Film
Georgian film director Tengiz Abuladze based the character of dictator Varlam Aravidze on Beria in his 1984 film Repentance. Although banned in the Soviet Union for its semi-allegorical critique of Stalinism, it premiered at the 1987 Cannes Film Festival, winning the FIPRESCI Prize, Grand Prize of the Jury, and the Prize of the Ecumenical Jury.

Beria was played by British actor Bob Hoskins in the 1991 film Inner Circle, and by David Suchet in Red Monarch. 

Simon Russell Beale played Beria in the 2017 satirical film The Death of Stalin.

Television 
In the 1958 CBS production of "The Plot to Kill Stalin" for Playhouse 90, Beria was portrayed by E. G. Marshall. In the 1992 HBO movie Stalin, Roshan Seth was cast as Beria.

In the 1999 film adaptation Animal Farm based on George Orwell's novel, Napoleon's bodyguard Pincher represents Beria.

Beria appears in the third episode ("Superbomb") of the four-part 2007 BBC docudrama series Nuclear Secrets, played by Boris Isarov. In the 2008 BBC documentary series World War II: Behind Closed Doors, Beria was portrayed by Polish actor .

He was also an important character in the 2013 Russian mini-series Kill Stalin, produced by Star Media.

In the 1969 Doctor Who story The War Games, actor Philip Madoc based the coldly evil War Lord on Beria, even wearing his pince-nez glasses.

Literature 
Richard Condon's 1959 novel The Manchurian Candidate describes brainwashed Raymond Shaw, the "perfectly prefabricated assassin", as "this dream by Lavrenti Beria".

In the 1964 science fiction novel by Arkady and Boris Strugatsky, Hard to Be a God, Beria is personified in the character Don Reba who serves as the king's minister of defence.

Alan Williams wrote a spy novel titled The Beria Papers, the plot of which revolves around Beria's alleged secret diaries recording his political and sexual depravities.

At the opening of Kingsley Amis' The Alteration, Lavrentiy Beria figures as "Monsignor Laurentius", paired with the similarly black-clad cleric "Monsignor Henricus" of the Holy Office (i.e., the Inquisition); the one to whom Beria was compared by Stalin in our own timeline: Heinrich Himmler. In the novel, both men are on the same side, serving an alternate-world Catholic Empire.

Beria is a significant character in the alternate history/alien invasion novel series Worldwar by Harry Turtledove, as well as the Axis of Time series by John Birmingham.

In the 1981 novel Noble House by James Clavell, set in 1963 Hong Kong, the main character Ian Dunross received from Alan Medford Grant a set of secret documents regarding a Soviet spy-ring in Hong Kong code-named "Sevrin". The document was signed by an LB, believed by Grant (and the mysterious Tip Tok-Toh) to be Lavrentiy Beria (written as Lavrenti Beria in the novel).

Beria is a significant character in the opening chapters of the 1998 novel Archangel by British novelist Robert Harris.

Beria is a minor character in the 2009 novel The Hundred-Year-Old Man Who Climbed Out the Window and Disappeared by Jonas Jonasson. Beria is described as the boss of the Soviet state's security and is in attendance at a meal with the main character and Stalin.

As "der Kleine Große Mann" ("the Little Big Man"), Beria appears as the lover of one of the leading characters, Christine, in the 2014 novel Das achte Leben (Für Brilka) (translated as "The Eighth Life (For Brilka)") by Nino Haratischwili.

In the 2015–2017 serialized science fiction novel Unsong by writer Scott Alexander, Beria is mentioned as being in the nicest part of hell, reserved for the worst sinners, along with Hitler and LaLaurie.

See also 
History of the Soviet Union
Democracy and Totalitarianism
 Kang Sheng

Notes

References

Works cited

Further reading 

 
 
 
 

 
 
 .

External links 

 .
 .
 Interview with Sergo Beria
 An outline of the Russian Supreme Court decision of 29 May 2000
 Annotated bibliography for Lavrentiy Beria from the Alsos Digital Library for Nuclear Issues
 Central Intelligence Agency, Office of Current Intelligence. The Reversal of the Doctors' Plot and Its Immediate Aftermath, 17 July 1953.
 Central Intelligence Agency, Office of Current Intelligence. Purge of L.P. Beria, 17 April 1954.
 Central Intelligence Agency, Office of Current Intelligence. Summarization of Reports Preceding Beria Purge, 17 August 1954.
 Lavrenty Beria performed by Bob Hoskins and other Russian historical celebrities played by foreign stars
 

 
1899 births
1953 deaths
NKVD officers
People from Gulripshi District
People from Sukhum Okrug
Mingrelians
Atheists from Georgia (country)
Old Bolsheviks
Politburo of the Central Committee of the Communist Party of the Soviet Union members
People's commissars and ministers of the Soviet Union
First convocation members of the Soviet of the Union
Second convocation members of the Soviet of the Union
Third convocation members of the Soviet of the Union
Cheka
Commissars General of State Security
Directors of intelligence agencies
First Secretaries of the Georgian Communist Party
Former Georgian Orthodox Christians
Communists from Georgia (country)
Genocide perpetrators
Soviet Georgian generals
Soviet Georgian NKVD officials
Spymasters
Heroes of Socialist Labour
Marshals of the Soviet Union
Nuclear weapons program of the Soviet Union
People of World War II from Georgia (country)
Recipients of the Order of Lenin
Recipients of the Order of Suvorov, 1st class
Recipients of the Order of the Red Banner
Stalin Prize winners
Great Purge perpetrators
Soviet rapists
People executed for treason against the Soviet Union
Members of the Communist Party of the Soviet Union executed by the Soviet Union
Executed Soviet people from Georgia (country)
People from Georgia (country) executed by the Soviet Union
People executed by the Soviet Union by firearm 
Deaths by firearm in Russia
Suspected serial killers
Executed mass murderers